Samuel Julies (born 4 July 1993) is a South African professional footballer who plays as a midfielder for National First Division club University of Pretoria.

He spent two seasons on loan at National First Division club Vasco Da Gama.

References

1993 births
Living people
South African soccer players
Association football midfielders
People from Kimberley, Northern Cape
Vasco da Gama (South Africa) players
Mamelodi Sundowns F.C. players
Chippa United F.C. players
Cape Town Spurs F.C. players
University of Pretoria F.C. players
South African Premier Division players
National First Division players